Tinashe Muchawaya (born 3 April 1997) is a Zimbabwean cricketer. He made his first-class debut for Rising Stars in the 2017–18 Logan Cup on 19 April 2018. He made his List A debut for Rising Stars in the 2017–18 Pro50 Championship on 29 April 2018. In December 2020, he was selected to play for the Mountaineers in the 2020–21 Logan Cup.

References

External links
 

1997 births
Living people
Zimbabwean cricketers
Place of birth missing (living people)
Rising Stars cricketers